Anes Rušević (born 2 December 1996) is a Serbian football player who plays for Rabotnički.

Career
He started his career at his hometown football club FK Novi Pazar, playing there until January 2017 after being transferred to BATE Borisov.

Club statistics

References

External links
 Anes Rušević stats at utakmica.rs 
 
 

1996 births
Living people
Sportspeople from Novi Pazar
Association football forwards
Serbian footballers
Serbian expatriate footballers
Serbian expatriate sportspeople in Belarus
Expatriate footballers in Belarus
Expatriate footballers in North Macedonia
Serbian SuperLiga players
Belarusian Premier League players
FK Novi Pazar players
FC BATE Borisov players
FK Napredak Kruševac players
FK Proleter Novi Sad players
FK Javor Ivanjica players
FK Rabotnički players